Francis Taaffe, 3rd Earl of Carlingford (1639August 1704), was 4th Viscount Taaffe, of Corren, and 4th Baron of Ballymote and an army commander and politician of Irish descent in the service of Emperor Ferdinand III in the Austrian capital Vienna and later of Duke Charles IV of Lorraine in Nancy.

Life
Francis Taaffe was born at Ballymote in County Sligo, Ireland, the third son of Theobald Taaffe, 1st Earl of Carlingford (who, following the Battle of Worcester had accompanied King Charles II of England in exile in 1652), and Mary (nee White), Countess of Carlingford. After the death of his elder brother, Francis received the titles of Earl of Carlingford and Viscount Taaffe, both belonging to the Peerage of Ireland.

By the agency of King Charles, Francis Taaffe studied at the University of Olomouc in Moravia, and became a page at the Imperial court in Vienna. He began a military career as a commander in the Imperial forces during the Franco-Dutch War and became a most intimate friend of the Lorrainian duke Charles IV, who from 1670 had to cope with the occupying troops of King Louis XIV of France. 

Taaffe rose to the rank of Field Marshal, having greatly distinguished himself at the 1683 Battle of Vienna and in other campaigns of the Great Turkish War, and was a member of the Order of the Golden Fleece. Lord Carlingford was sent on many important diplomatic missions, and at the end of his life was chancellor and chief minister to Duke Leopold of Lorraine.

Family
In 1676, he married Helena Maximiliana von Traudisch. He died without children in August 1704 in Nancy, where he is buried at the Cathédrale Notre-Dame-de-l’Annonciation et Saint-Sigisbert in Nancy.

Notes

References 

 G.E. Cokayne, Vicary Gibbs, H.A. Doubleday, Geoffrey H. White, Duncan Warrand and Lord Howard de Walden, Hrsg.: The Complete Peerage of England, Scotland, Ireland, Great Britain and the United Kingdom, Extant, Extinct or Dormant, new ed., Band III, page 29.
 Jérémy Filet, “The networks of Francis Taaffe, 3rd Earl of Carlingford and Irish Jacobite émigrés in the Duchy of Lorraine” in Eighteenth-Century Ireland 36, 2021.

External links 
 ThePeerage.com

Knights of the Golden Fleece
1639 births
1704 deaths
Palacký University Olomouc alumni
Field marshals of the Holy Roman Empire
Viscounts Taaffe
Earls in the Peerage of Ireland